Margarita Arenas Guzmán (born 25 January 1957) is a Mexican politician affiliated with the National Action Party. As of 2014 she served as Deputy of the LX Legislature of the Mexican Congress representing Guanajuato.

References

1957 births
Living people
Politicians from Guanajuato
Women members of the Chamber of Deputies (Mexico)
National Action Party (Mexico) politicians
21st-century Mexican politicians
21st-century Mexican women politicians
Universidad Autónoma de San Luis Potosí alumni
Autonomous University of Queretaro alumni
Deputies of the LX Legislature of Mexico
Members of the Chamber of Deputies (Mexico) for Guanajuato